Monica Saili (born 18 September 1997) is a Samoan swimmer who currently lives in New Zealand. She competed in the 50 m, 100 m, 200 m, 400m, 800 m freestyle, 50 m, 100 m breaststroke, 50 m, 100 m backstroke, 100 m butterfly and 100 m individual medley events at the 2012 FINA World Swimming Championships (25 m). Saili also competed in the 800 m and 400 m freestyle events at the 2013 World Aquatics Championships.

She subsequently studied languages and culture at Victoria University of Wellington.

References

Living people
1997 births
Samoan female swimmers
20th-century Samoan people
21st-century Samoan people